David Eldridge may refer to:

 David Eldridge (Western Reserve) (died 1797), earliest known person of European descent to die in the Western Reserve, Cleveland, Ohio
 David Eldridge (dramatist) (born 1973), English dramatist